The Maney-Sidway House, also known as Jasmine Grove and as Myles Manor, is a building in Franklin, Tennessee originally built c.1836, that was listed on the National Register of Historic Places in 1988.

The building served as a hospital for Union wounded following the Battle of Franklin.

It was extensively remodelled in 1916 in Neo-Classical style, including adding an elliptical, two-story portico to the main facade of the building.  For the 1916 renovations of the property, it is included in a survey of historic resources of Williamson County as one of only a few notable residential structures in the county that were built during 1900–1935.  Henry H. Mayberry House was another, as was a remodelling of the Randal McGavock House, both reflecting Neo-Classical style.

The National Register listing includes  with  two contributing buildings, one contributing structure, and two non-contributing structures.

References

Houses on the National Register of Historic Places in Tennessee
Houses in Franklin, Tennessee
Neoclassical architecture in Tennessee
Houses completed in 1836
National Register of Historic Places in Williamson County, Tennessee